Hautajärvi (also Hautajarvi, Hautajaervi, Hautakyla, Hautakylä, Khautajarvi, and Хаутаярви) is a village in southeast Lapland, Finland, near the border with the Republic of Karelia and the Murmansk Oblast of the Russian Federation. Hautajärvi is located in the Salla municipality. It is a trail head for the Bear's Ring hiking trail, and gateway for the Oulanka National Park.

References

External links
 "Hautajarvi Map — Satellite Images of Hautajarvi" Maplania

Villages in Finland